Abderrahman Samba (born 5 September 1995) is a Qatari male track and field athlete who specialises in the 400 metres hurdles. He was born and grew up in Saudi Arabia but chose to represent Mauritania – his father's homeland – before eventually switching allegiance to Qatar and moving to Doha in 2015. He became eligible to compete for his adopted country in May 2016. He was the second person to run the 400m hurdle event in less than 47 seconds.

Samba placed seventh at the 2017 World Championships in Athletics on his global debut. He appeared suddenly on the elite athletics scene, having run modest sprint times in 2016 before winning the 400 m hurdles race at the Qatar leg of the 2017 IAAF Diamond League, beating Olympic champion Kerron Clement. He ranked eighth in the world that season with his new personal best of 48.31 seconds.

In February 2018, he won a 4 × 400 metres relay gold medal with a Qatari team of Mohamed Nasir Abbas, Mohamed El Nour and Abdalelah Haroun at the Asian Indoor Athletics Championships. Then, in the Summer season, he ran the 400 m hurdles in 46.98, the second fastest time ever, at the Meeting de Paris. and won two gold medal at the Asian Games in Indonesia in 400 metres hurdles and 4 × 400 metres relay.

In April 2019, he won the gold medal in the 2019 Asian Athletics Championships in 400 hurdles and, after being injured through Summer, in October the bronze medal at the World Athletics Championships. He was elected best athlete in Asia at the end of the year.

International competitions

Personal bests 

All information from IAAF profile. Last updated 8 March 2019

References

External links

 
 
 
 

1995 births
Living people
Qatari male hurdlers
Qatari male sprinters
Asian Games gold medalists for Qatar
Asian Games gold medalists in athletics (track and field)
Athletes (track and field) at the 2018 Asian Games
Medalists at the 2018 Asian Games
World Athletics Championships athletes for Qatar
World Athletics Championships medalists
IAAF Continental Cup winners
Asian Athletics Championships winners
Asian Indoor Athletics Championships winners
Mauritanian emigrants to Qatar
Athletes (track and field) at the 2020 Summer Olympics
Olympic athletes of Qatar